Bez Tebe is the debut studio album by Slovenian singer Senidah. It was released on 25 March 2019 by Belgrade-based label Bassivity Digital. Senidah wrote the album mostly with her frequent collaborators Benjamin Krnetić and Anže Kacafura, who produced the record. The album produced three official singles: "Slađana", "Belo" and "Bez tebe". "Nisi bio tu" was also released as a promotional single. Primarily an alternative R&B and trap record, Bez Tebe also incorporates synth-pop and trip hop elements. Lyrically, songs are about searching for love.

Background
In March 2018 Senidah released her trap solo single "Slađana" for Belgrade-based label Bassivity Digital, quickly acquiring popularity in Serbia. The second single "Belo" (White) was then released on 3 June. The title track and "Nisi Bio Tu" (You Weren't Here) were released on 28 December, alongside lyrics videos. "Slađana" won The Best Hip-Hop Song of the Year Award at the 2019 Music Awards Ceremony. She started teasing the album on the ceremony red carpet, alongside her collaboration with RAF Camora.

On 19 March 2019 Senidah announced the release of her debut studio album via Instagram. On the day of release, she held a promotion for media, friends and colleagues and presented the music video for "Crno Srce" (Black Heart). The rest of the songs were uploaded to YouTube on 15 May.

Music and lyrics
An alternative R&B and trap record, Bez Tebe also features elements of synth-pop and trip hop. The songs were composed by Senidah alongside album's producer Anže Kacafura, while the lyrics were written by Benjamin Krnetić.

The album's opening track, "Soba" (Room), has a slow trap beat completed with emotional lyrics, settling the tone for the whole record. The meaning behind the title of the lead single, "Slađana", which is a common female first name, was said to be a representation of a random girl seeking for love, whom people can relate to. Whilst, some believe that the title is referring to the street slang term for amphetamine and its influence as an escape from reality, disappointment and loneliness. Others think it's referring to Serbian rock musician Slađana Milošević, who's noted for her unique appearance and musical style. The third track, "Crno Srce" (Black Heart), deepens the dark atmosphere. However, "Aman" (Enough Already) brings brighter vibe, despite singing about a relationship coming to its end. The song also incorporates several Turkish terms common to the Western Balkans. The title track, "Bez Tebe", is a melancholic trap ballad. Sixth track, "Treći Svet" (Third World), was described as a "summer jam". "Vatra" (Fire), also features summer motives, but with a darker tone. "Belo" (White), again holds a drug reference this time with explicit allusions laced throughout the track. "Strava" (Horror) was described as a synth-pop love song influenced by the '80s music. The final track, "Nisi Bio Tu" (You Weren't Here) was based on an unfortunate event from Senidah's life and brings honest ending to the album, featuring acoustic guitar and powerful vocals. In an interview for the Serbian edition of Hello! she dubbed it "her saddest song that she doesn't want to talk about". It is reportedly inspired by a traffic accident that she survived unharmed when she was four years old, which killed her father, seriously injured her mother, and put her sister into a coma.

Critical reception

Bez Tebe was met with generally positive reviews from critics.

On behalf of Slovenian magazine Mladina, Gregor Kocijančič praised the album and remarked that Senidah brought back the epicentre of Balkan music to Ljubljana for the first time following the punk scene of the 1980s. Nevertheless, he was critical of the record's occasional embrace of turbo-folk elements, while abandoning the frames of R&B.

Writing for Muzika.hr, Patrik Horvat called the album the artist's "powerful and interesting introduction to the general public", noting that she "faithfully transformed her heavy emotions into impressive pieces of art that were authentically brought out by her voice". Buro 24/7 stated that Senidah "should not be worried about her status on the music scene", dubbing her persona "unique" and noting that her songs "scream with emotions despite occasionally unintelligible lyrics."

Vanja Ratković of Noizz.rs drew comparisons between Senidah's voice and the voice of British musician FKA Twigs "due to their mysteriousness", claiming that "the Balkans have finally come up with an artist who can compete at an international level".

Year-end lists

Track listing
Credits adapted from Discogs.

Notes
"Slađana" is stylized as "Sladjana".
"Treći Svet" is stylized in sentence case.

Release history

References

2019 debut albums
Senidah albums